Thermochrous is a genus of moths in the Anomoeotidae family.

Species
Thermochrous exigua Talbot, 1932
Thermochrous fumicincta Hampson, 1910
Thermochrous marginata Talbot, 1929
Thermochrous melanoneura Hampson, 1920
Thermochrous neurophaea Hering, 1928
Thermochrous stenocraspis Hampson, 1910
Thermochrous succisa Hering, 1937

Anomoeotidae
Zygaenoidea genera